The Caracas brushfinch (Arremon phaeopleurus) is a species of bird in the family Passerellidae.

Taxonomy

The Caracas brushfinch was often treated as a subspecies of the stripe-headed brushfinch (A. torquatus), but was determined a distinct species on the basis of differences in vocalization, plumage, and genetics.  SACC split the group in 2010.

References

 

Caracas brushfinch
Birds of the Venezuelan Coastal Range
Endemic birds of Venezuela
Caracas brushfinch
Caracas brushfinch